AMOS-17  is an Israeli commercial communications satellite, part of the AMOS series of satellites.

History 
Spacecom, the AMOS satellites operator, announced in December 2016 that it has signed a US$161 million contract with Boeing to build AMOS-17, which is to replace the failed AMOS-5 satellite.

Satellite description 
AMOS-17 is a multi-band high-throughput satellite. It features a Ka-band, Ku-band anc C-band communications payload. It was built on the BSS-702MP satellite bus, transmitting in the Ka-band, Ku-band, and C-bands. It is a replacement for AMOS-5 and provides coverage over the continent of Africa, Europe and Middle East.

Launch 
It was launched on 6 August 2019, at 23:23:00 UTC by a Falcon 9 launch vehicle, from Cape Canaveral, SLC-40, Florida. The mass of the payload was too large to allow the booster to be recovered for reuse, so the customer paid for an "expended" launch.

Mission 
The satellite was reportedly aimed to be located at 17° East longitude but, early November 2019, it was at 14° East where it has been since 19 August 2019. The satellite recovered its destination to 17° East again meanwhile.

References 

Satellite television
Communications satellites of Israel
Communications satellites in geostationary orbit
Spacecraft launched in 2019
2019 in Israel
SpaceX commercial payloads